Floridia is an Italian surname. Notable people with the surname include:

 Barbara Floridia (born 1977), Italian politician
 Pietro Floridia (1860–1932), Italian composer

Italian-language surnames
Surnames of Italian origin